I Grow Tired But Dare Not Fall Asleep is the fifth studio album by British musician Ghostpoet. It was released 1 May 2020 under PIAS Recordings.

Promotion

Singles
"Concrete Pony" was released as the first single from the album on 29 January 2020. The second single "Nowhere To Hide Now" was released 7 April 2020.

Critical reception
I Grow Tired But Dare Not Fall Asleep was met with generally favourable reviews from critics. At Metacritic, which assigns a weighted average rating out of 100 to reviews from mainstream publications, this release received an average score of 79, based on 12 reviews.

Track listing

Charts

References

2020 albums
Ghostpoet albums
PIAS Recordings albums